Dawid Abrahamowicz (1839–1926) was a Polish conservative politician and social activist of Armenian descent. Brother of Adolf Abrahamowicz, from 1863–1918 he was a member of the Diet of Galicia and Lodomeria, from 1875–1918 a member of the Imperial Council, and from 1881–1909 a member of the Chamber of Deputies.

References

1839 births
1926 deaths
People from Ivano-Frankivsk Oblast
People from the Kingdom of Galicia and Lodomeria
Polish people of Armenian descent
Members of the Austrian House of Deputies (1873–1879)
Members of the Austrian House of Deputies (1879–1885)
Members of the Austrian House of Deputies (1885–1891)
Members of the Austrian House of Deputies (1891–1897)
Members of the Austrian House of Deputies (1897–1900)
Members of the Austrian House of Deputies (1901–1907)
Members of the Austrian House of Deputies (1907–1911)
Members of the Austrian House of Deputies (1911–1918)
Members of the House of Lords (Austria)
Members of the Diet of Galicia and Lodomeria
Members of the Legislative Sejm of the Second Polish Republic
Burials at Lychakiv Cemetery
19th-century Polish landowners
20th-century Polish landowners